Gəraybəyli or Geraybeyli may refer to:
Gəraybəyli, Ismailli, Azerbaijan
Gəraybəyli, Ujar, Azerbaijan